Jörg Schneider may refer to:
 Jörg Schneider (actor)
 Jörg Schneider (politician)
 Jörg Schneider (tenor)